Simon Phillips (born 6 February 1957) is a US-based English jazz, fusion and rock drummer, songwriter, and record producer. He worked with rock bands during the 1970s and 1980s and was the drummer for the band Toto from 1992 to 2014.

Phillips worked as a session drummer for Jeff Beck, Gary Moore, Michael Schenker, Bernie Marsden, Jon Lord, Nik Kershaw, Mike Oldfield, Judas Priest, Mike Rutherford, Tears for Fears, 10cc, Pete Townshend and The Who. He was the drummer for The Who during the band's American reunion tour in 1989. He became the drummer for the band Toto in 1992 after the death of Jeff Porcaro.

Career
Phillips began to play professionally at the age of twelve in a Dixieland band led by his father, Sid Phillips for four years. After his father's death, he started playing pop and rock and found work in a production of the musical Jesus Christ Superstar. He worked as a session musician for cast members, and this led to other session work. Beginning in the 1970s, he worked with Jeff Beck, Gil Evans, Stanley Clarke, Peter Gabriel, Pete Townshend, and Frank Zappa.

Phillips was the drummer in the Phil Manzanera and Brian Eno supergroup 801 on their 1976 album 801 Live. He replaced Judas Priest drummer Alan Moore to record on the band's Sin After Sin album (1977), and on that album, Phillips introduced the combination of the double bass drumming that would come to define heavy metal in later years, particularly the thrash metal sub-genre which emerged in the 1980s. The track "Dissident Aggressor" was an early example of the tempo and aggression which would soon become synonymous with the New Wave of British Heavy Metal. Author Andrew L. Cope has described Sin After Sin as a key album in the development of heavy metal technique, in particular for its use of double kick drumming. That same year, Phillips played on Evita. Around 1978, British guitarist Gary Boyle made an album called "The Dancer" featuring Simon Phillips.

Phillips played on Michael Schenker's 1980 debut album The Michael Schenker Group, as well as in Mike Rutherford's Smallcreep's Day. In the early 1980s, Phillips formed part of RMS with session musicians Mo Foster and Ray Russell. 

Phillips played & co-wrote songs on Jeff Beck's 1980 jazz-rock fusion album There & Back, featuring his double-kick prowess on the song "Space Boogie" which he also co-wrote. Another track "The Pump" was co-written by Phillips & appeared on the soundtrack to the 1983 film Risky Business.

In 1981, he formed Ph.D. with Jim Diamond and Tony Hymas. The new wave outfit released two albums and five singles, including "Little Suzi's on the Up" and "I Won't Let You Down", before splitting up in 1983. 

He was the drummer for the Who on their 1989 American reunion tour and appeared on solo recordings by band members Roger Daltrey and Pete Townshend.

Also in 1989, he recorded his debut album with the band Protocol. Wanting to make bigger changes in his music career, Phillips decided to move to Los Angeles in the 1990s.

Toto
In 1992, Phillips had recently completed the recording of an album in England when he was invited by Toto to fill in for Jeff Porcaro after the latter died following the completion of the recording of Kingdom of Desire. He became the band's only choice to replace Jeff for two reasons: Jeff himself viewed Phillips as one of his most favorite drummers (the others being Gregg Bissonnette and Vinnie Colaiuta) and that he toured with Steve Lukather and Carlos Santana on their solo tours. Phillips decided to settle permanently in Los Angeles on that matter and began rehearsals with the band. After the Kingdom of Desire tour, Phillips officially joined Toto.

As the band began its 1995 Tambu tour, Phillips suffered from back problems and was unable to play on the first leg of the said tour; the band turned to Gregg Bissonette to substitute for him. When Phillips fell ill prior to the 2004 Night of the Proms concert, Bissonette was unavailable to take over his drumming duties, causing the band to invite Ricky Lawson instead.

Phillips' last show with Toto was in 2013. He left the following year to focus on his solo career and was replaced by Keith Carlock.

Other ventures
Five years later he led a band that performed at the North Sea Jazz Festival. In 2000 he recorded a jazz album, Vantage Point, with trumpeter Walt Fowler, saxophonist Brandon Fields, and pianist Jeff Babko. He has co-produced and engineered albums by Mike Oldfield, Derek Sherinian, and Toto. 
After leaving Toto, he became a member of a trio with Hiromi Uehara and bassist Anthony Jackson. Phillips has also worked with Big Country, Jack Bruce, David Gilmour, Big Jim Sullivan, and Whitesnake.

In 2009, Phillips joined with keyboardist Philippe Saisse and bassist Pino Palladino in forming an instrumental jazz/funk rock trio: Phillips Saisse Palladino, PSP, which toured in Europe in 2009 and 2010. Phillips also performed on Joe Satriani's album Super Colossal, appearing on multiple tracks. Phillips appears in Alan Parsons' Art & Science of Sound Recording educational video series, as well as the program's single "All Our Yesterdays". He played in the Michael Schenker Group album In the Midst of Beauty and took part to the band's 30th Anniversary world tour in 2010. Phillips is featured on Hiromi Uehara's 2011 album, Voice. He also toured with Hiromi and bassist Anthony Jackson as part of the Hiromi Trio Project.

In 2019 Phillips was featured on the album Origin of Species. In addition to playing drums and keyboards, he engineered, mixed, and helped produce.

Phillips cites Buddy Rich, Tony Williams, Billy Cobham, Steve Gadd, Ian Paice, Tommy Aldridge and Bernard Purdie as his main influences.

Awards and honours
 In 2003, he was inducted into the Modern Drummer magazine Hall of Fame.
In 2015 at the 14th Annual Independent Music Awards, Phillips was the winner in the Jazz Instrumental Album category for Protocol II.
 In 2019 Simon was voted #1 in the Fusion category of the annual Modern Drummer Readers Poll.
In 2019 the Protocol 4 album was nominated for a GRAMMY Award in the Contemporary Instrumental Album category.

Partial discography

As leader
 Protocol (Food for Thought, 1988)
 Simon Phillips (Manhattan, 1992)
 Force Majeure with Ray Russell, Anthony Jackson, Tony Roberts (B&W, 1993)
 Symbiosis (Lipstick, 1995)
 Another Lifetime (Lipstick, 1997)
 Out of the Blue (Victor, 1999)
 Vantage Point with Jeff Babko (Jazzline, 2000)
 Protocol II with Andy Timmons, Steve Weingart, Ernest Tibbs (Phantom, 2013)
 Protocol III with Andy Timmons, Steve Weingart, Ernest Tibbs (In-akustik, 2015)
 Protocol 4 with Greg Howe, Dennis Hamm, Ernest Tibbs (Phantom, 2017)
 Protocol V with Otmaro Ruiz, Alex Sill, Jacob Scesney, Ernest Tibbs (Phantom, 2022)

As sideman
With Duncan Browne
 The Wild Places (1978)
 Streets Of Fire (1979)

With Asia
 Aqua (1992)
 Aura (2001)

With DarWin
 DarWin 2: A Frozen War (2020)

With Derek Sherinian
 Inertia (Inside Out, 2001)
 Black Utopia (J.S.H.P., 2003)
 Mythology (Inside Out, 2004)
 Blood of the Snake (Inside Out, 2006)
 Oceana (Music Theories, 2011)
 The Phoenix (Inside Out, 2020)
 Vortex (Inside Out, 2022)

With Gary Moore
 Back on the Streets (1978)
 After the War (1989)

With Gordon Giltrap
Visionary (The Electric Record Company, catalogue no. TRIX 2) (1976)
Perilous Journey (The Electric Record Company, catalogue no. TRIX 4) (1977)
Fear of the Dark (The Electric Record Company) (1978)
With 801
 801 Live (1976)
 Listen Now (1977)
 Live @ Hull (2009)
 Latino (2013)
 Manchester (2015)

With Hiromi
 Voice (Telarc, 2011)
 Move (Telarc, 2012)
 Alive (Telarc, 2014)
 Move: Live in Tokyo (Telarc, 2014)
 Spark (Telarc, 2016)

With Jeff Beck
 There & Back (Epic, 1980)

With Jack Bruce
 How's Tricks (RSO, 1977)
 Cities of the Heart (CMP, 1994)
 Jet Set Jewel (Polydor, 2003)

With Joe Satriani
 Flying in a Blue Dream (Relativity, 1989)
 The Extremist (Relativity, 1992)
 Time Machine (Relativity, 1993)
 Super Colossal (Epic, 2006)

With Jon Anderson
 Song of Seven (Atlantic, 1980)
 Animation (Polydor, 1982)

With Jon Lord
 Before I Forget (Harvest, 1982)

With Judas Priest
 Sin After Sin (CBS, Inc. (UK)), (Columbia (US)) (1977)

With L. Shankar
 Touch Me There (Produced by Frank Zappa) (1979)

With Michael Schenker
 The Michael Schenker Group (Chrysalis, 1980)
 The 30th Anniversary Concert – Live in Tokyo (In-akustik, 2010)
 In the Midst of Beauty (In-akustik, 2008)
 Temple of Rock (In-akustik, 2011)

With Mike Oldfield
 Crises (Virgin, 1983)
 Discovery (Virgin, 1984)
 Islands (Virgin, 1987)
 Heaven's Open (Virgin, 1991)

With Nik Kershaw
 Radio Musicola (MCA, 1986)
 You've Got to Laugh (Short House Records, 2006)

With Pete Townshend
 Empty Glass (ATCO, 1980)
 All the Best Cowboys Have Chinese Eyes (ATCO, 1982)
 White City: A Novel (ATCO, 1985)
 The Iron Man: The Musical by Pete Townshend (Virgin, 1989)

With Ph.D.
 PhD (Atlantic, 1981)
 Is It Safe? (WEA, 1983)
 Three (Voiceprint, 2009)

With Steve Hackett
 Beyond the Shrouded Horizon (WHD 2011)
 At the Edge of Light (2019)

With Mike Rutherford
 Smallcreep's Day (Charisma Records, 1980)

With Madness (band)
 The Madness (Virgin, 1988)

With Steve Lukather
 Candyman (Columbia, 1994)
 Santamental (Favored Nations, 2005)

With Toto
 Absolutely Live (Columbia, 1993)
 Tambu (Columbia, 1995)
 Toto XX (1998)
 Mindfields (Columbia, 1999)
 Livefields (Columbia, 1999)
 Through the Looking Glass (EMI, 2002)
 Live in Amsterdam (Eagle, 2002)
 Falling in Between (Frontiers, 2006)
 Falling in Between Live (2007)
 Live in Poland (Eagle, 2014)

With Toyah
 The Changeling (1982)
 Warrior Rock: Toyah on Tour (1982)

With Trevor Rabin
 Wolf (Chrysalis, 1981)

With The Who
 Join Together (Virgin, 1990)
 Thirty Years of Maximum R&B (Polydor, 1994)

With Intelligent Music Project
 My Kind o' Lovin''' (2014)
 Touching the Divine (2015)
 Sorcery Inside (2018)
 Life Motion'' (2020)

See also
 List of drummers

References

External links

Official site 
Simon Phillips Chronology & Releasography Site

1957 births
Living people
People educated at Bushey Meads School
People from Los Angeles
20th-century drummers
20th-century British male musicians
20th-century British musicians
21st-century drummers
21st-century British male musicians
British male drummers
English jazz drummers
English rock drummers
English session musicians
British male jazz musicians
801 (band) members
Greenslade members
Judas Priest members
Michael Schenker Group members
Ph.D. (band) members
RMS (band) members
The Best (band) members
Toto (band) members
Toyah (band) members
Music for Nations artists